Canterbury University may refer to:
 University of Canterbury, in Christchurch, Canterbury, New Zealand
 University of Kent at Canterbury, plateglass university in Canterbury, England  (renamed "University of Kent")
 Canterbury Christ Church University, Anglican university in Canterbury, England
 Canterbury University (Seychelles), unaccredited institution with a mailing address in the Seychelles